Granelli is an Italian surname. Notable people with the surname include:

Andy Granelli (born 1979), American drummer
Jerry Granelli (1940–2021), American-born Canadian jazz drummer
Luigi Granelli (1929–1999), Italian politician
Mireille Granelli (born 1936), French actress

See also
Gianelli

Italian-language surnames